Plough Lane – named the Cherry Red Records Stadium for sponsorship reasons – is a football stadium in Wimbledon, south-west London, which has been the home of AFC Wimbledon since 3 November 2020. A groundshare with rugby league side London Broncos began in 2022.

Stands 
 West Stand – 4,267 capacity
 South Stand (safe standing terrace) – 1,092 capacity
 East Stand – 2,391 capacity
 North Stand (away end) – 1,465 capacity

History 
Wimbledon F.C. played its matches at the original Plough Lane stadium from 1912 until 1991. AFC Wimbledon's new stadium lies approximately 200 yards further east. After 1991 Wimbledon F.C. began a ground-share with Crystal Palace at Selhurst Park, with the intention of moving to a new all-seater stadium elsewhere at a later date due to the original Plough Lane stadium being considered unsuitable for conversion into a modern all-seater stadium. Numerous locations within and beyond the borders of Merton were considered for a possible new stadium, but none of these came to fruition, and in 2003 the original Wimbledon club relocated 70 miles north to Milton Keynes, being rebranded as Milton Keynes Dons the following year.

In 2002 a phoenix club, AFC Wimbledon, was formed by a section of the club's supporters after the Football Association gave Wimbledon F.C. permission to move to Milton Keynes. In the meantime, AFC Wimbledon played at Kingsmeadow, at that time the home of Kingstonian.

Since its inception, AFC Wimbledon stated that one of its primary aims was to return to Merton, with a new stadium close to what it regards as its "spiritual home" of the original Plough Lane. This aim formed the basis of a project to create a new purpose-built stadium on the site of the Wimbledon Greyhound Stadium, located approximately 200 yards from the original Plough Lane football stadium, where the original Wimbledon side played for 80 years.

Plans to develop the greyhound stadium site as either a multi-purpose stadium or as a football stadium were publicised frequently by the club and the media prior to 2013. In 2013 AFC Wimbledon announced that discussions were underway with Merton Council over a joint bid for the greyhound stadium and the surrounding land, in cooperation with developer Galliard Homes, to build a new football stadium, 600 residential properties and a range of community facilities.

Development 
Construction proceeded with the permanent west stand initially, with main entry from the south off Plough Lane. This is a four-storey structure with general admission access from the first floor, and hospitality above. This structure seats 4,267 spectators; semi-permanent stands on the other three sides brings initial capacity to 9,215. Among the semi-permanent seating, the most vocal home fans will be in the south, which will include a safe standing area; a family area along the east; and away fans will be in the north stand, which is isolated with its own entry. A secondary entrance for home fans in the south and east stands is located on the easterly pedestrian-only street, Greyhound Parade.

The plans for the football stadium were approved unanimously by Merton Council on 10 December 2015. Clearance of the site in preparation for the new football stadium and housing was begun on 16 March 2018. The stadium's opening was initially planned for summer 2019, but did not take place until 3 November 2020. The land's freehold was transferred to an AFC Wimbledon subsidiary on 24 December 2018, among other transactions that also formally transferred ownership of Kingsmeadow to Chelsea.

Finances 
The club thus purchased and cleared the site of the former Wimbledon Greyhound Stadium in anticipation of construction. In 2019 it was announced that a minimum of £2 million in crowdfunding would be needed to construct a scaled-down version of the original design with a single permanent stand and an initial capacity of 9,000; as of August 2019, the £2 million mark had been raised through Seedrs. In November 2019 it emerged that financing of a final £11m needed to complete the ground as envisioned was not forthcoming; the club's fan ownership initially considered scaling down the project, or accepting outside investment into the club by relinquishing ownership to meet the shortfall. However, alternate financing was quickly raised by club supporters by way of a bond issue which raised over £5 million. In May 2020, the final remaining financing needed to sign all construction contracts was confirmed following key investment from local businessman Nick Robertson.

Opening 
AFC Wimbledon played their first match at the ground on 3 November 2020 against Doncaster Rovers - a 2–2 draw, with the first ever goal at the new stadium scored by Wimbledon's Joe Pigott in the 18th minute of that match. There were no fans in attendance though due to COVID-19 restrictions. The first game at the new stadium with fans was on 18 May 2021 when 2,000 people watched the Dons play Liverpool's under-23 side in a test match. AFC Wimbledon's first home league match in the 2021-22 season was watched by 7,728 fans, in a 3-3 draw against Bolton Wanderers.

In December 2020, the Dons Trust announced that they were discussing a potential groundshare agreement with Rugby League side London Broncos. A vote by the Trust membership in March 2021 resulted in 91.7% of those voting in favour. It was subject to revised planning permission which had been opposed by a group of residents but these issues were resolved before the 2022 season.

On 25 March 2021, an NHS COVID-19 vaccination centre opened in the stadium's event space; a number of the first to be vaccinated were club supporters.

On 16 September 2021, the club agreed a further three year deal with their Kingsmeadow stadium sponsor Cherry Red Records and thus Plough Lane was renamed the Cherry Red Records Stadium.

The first match to take place at the ground with a capacity crowd was AFC Wimbledon's 3–3 draw against Bolton Wanderers on 14 August 2021. The largest attendance at Plough Lane of 8,568 on 15 October 2022 for a League Two match against Sutton United.

On 30 January 2022, the London Broncos played their first match at Plough Lane against the Widnes Vikings.

On 5 March 2022, the FA Women's Continental League Cup Final between Chelsea Women and Manchester City Women was staged there.

Sponsorship 
Current sponsors for the various parts of the stadium are:

The stadium as a whole is sponsored by Cherry Red Records since 16 September 2021; the company had previously been stadium sponsors at Kingsmeadow.

The Ry Stand – As they had at Kingsmeadow under the name RyGas, the RyGroup of tradesmens' services are sponsoring the east stand opposite the main stand.
The Cherry Red Records End – The north, away, stand.
The Cappagh Stand – The west, or main, stand; sponsored by Cappagh, a local construction group.
The South London Movers Stand – The south, home-supporters' stand; sponsored by South London Movers, a local bespoke-removals company.

Expansion

The ground has planning permission to be expanded to 20,000 spectators.

References

External links

Sport in the London Borough of Merton
Football venues in London
AFC Wimbledon
Buildings and structures in Wimbledon, London
English Football League venues
2020 establishments in England
Sports venues completed in 2020